Glenstrup Abbey was a Benedictine monastery occupied briefly at various points during its history by the Carthusians as Glenstrup Charterhouse and by the Bridgettines. The abbey was located at Glenstrup near Randers, Denmark.

History

Benedictine monks
Glenstrup Abbey, dedicated to the Virgin Mary, was founded about 1125 on Glenstrup Lake, near the town of Hobro, as a Benedictine monastery. The nobleman Svend Bo and his wife Inger Thott gave property and several farms to support it in the mid-12th century. In some records it was nicknamed "Nørre Abbey". It was built on the site of a holy spring called Maria's Spring in medieval times. The location was a religious one in Viking times and the abbey was most likely constructed on the site of a stave chapel built to Christianize the place in the late 11th century.

The monastery was built in the traditional three ranges attached to a church as a four-sided enclosure. The massive Romanesque tower was an unusual feature on the west front of the abbey church.

Few records about the abbey survive. It is mentioned in a papal bull of the mid-13th century, probably issued by Pope Alexander III.

At its height the abbey owned many farms, two mills, and several churches from which it collected tithes. It also owned the permanent rights to fish eels from the lake, where it built a permanent eel trap. It also had the rights to income from the fair or market held on Lady Day, which was held in nearby fields as late as 1552.

The abbey however eventually entered a long slow decline which culminated in its closure in 1431. Although records are sparse, this was apparently caused by a combination of lack of revenue and declining religious standards which meant that there were no novices.  Ulrik, Bishop of Aarhus, decided that the house had become unruly and that to maintain it would cost the diocese more than it brought in; the last Benedictine monks were therefore removed, and an effort made to interest another order in the premises.

Glenstrup Charterhouse
At the suggestion of King Eric of Pomerania, Bishop Ulrik gave the abbey and the income properties from the recently closed priory of Our Lady in Randers to the Carthusian Order for the establishment of a new charterhouse in the Diocese of Aarhus in 1429. The Carthusians settled briefly at the vacant Glenstrup Abbey, creating Glenstrup Charterhouse, but abandoned the site by 1441.

Benedictine monks
Bishop Ulrik then tried to re-establish a Benedictine community, but the attempt was short-lived, and the Benedictines left Glenstrup for the last time before 1445.

Bridgettine nuns
Bishop Ulrik then gave the abbey and its attendant properties to the newly established Bridgettine Mariager Abbey. The Bridgettines were seen in the mid-15th century as a reforming order capable of restoring the religious zeal that many religious houses had lost and re-establishing the strict standards which by this time many had abandoned. They were however only interested in the estates of Glenstrup, and demolished the abbey premises shortly after 1445, leaving only the church.

Sources and external links
Glenstrup Abbey 
 Glenstrup Abbey in Salmonsens Konversationslexikon, nd. 

Benedictine monasteries in Denmark
Carthusian monasteries in Denmark
Bridgettine monasteries in Denmark